The Baker's Wife is a 1938 French drama film directed by Marcel Pagnol. It is based on the novel Blue Boy by French author Jean Giono and became the basis of the American musical The Baker's Wife.

It tells how the peace of a Provençal village is shattered when the baker's wife runs off with a handsome shepherd. In his despair, the baker becomes heartbroken and can no longer bake. The villagers organise themselves to bring the wife back to her husband and so regain their daily bread.

Plot
One summer night in an idyllic village in the south of France, the pretty young wife of the baker runs off with a handsome young shepherd. Finding her gone in the morning, the baker is devastated. He pretends she has had to go suddenly to her mother, but people are not fooled and their efforts at consoling him misfire. Going into Sunday mass, he is deeply upset at what seems an unfeeling sermon from the inexperienced young priest and heads for the café, where he gets publicly drunk on pastis.

The marquis, who is the local landowner, and the schoolteacher take the situation in hand. Getting the baker to bed, with the support of the priest they call a public meeting to discuss solutions. Dividing the area into twelve sectors, twelve patrols mount an exhaustive search and one reports a sighting. She was seen by an angler in a glade with the shepherd, naked. The priest and the schoolteacher are chosen for the delicate task of persuading her to return. The shepherd makes off fast and the priest takes her to a quiet place, while the schoolteacher returns with the good news that she is found.

After the priest has read her the story of Jesus and the woman taken in adultery, he forgives her and takes her home. Her first word to her husband is "Sorry" and he forgives her too, though he can't resist a few choice words about randy young shepherds who charm you, love you and leave you. Together they light the oven, so that the village will have bread in the morning.

Cast 
 Raimu as Aimable, the baker
 Ginette Leclerc as Aurélie, the baker's wife
 Fernand Charpin as the Marquis
 Charles Moulin as the Shepherd
 Robert Vattier as the Priest
 Charles Blavette as Antonin
 Robert Bassac as the Schoolteacher
 Marcel Maupi as Barnabé
 Alida Rouffe as Céleste
 Odette Roger as Miette
 Yvette Fournier as Hermine
 Maximilienne as Angèle
 Charblay as the Butcher
 Julien Maffre as Pétugue
 Adrien Legros as Barthélemy
 Jean Castan as Esprit

Awards 
 National Board of Review Awards (1940), Best Foreign Film
National Board of Review Awards (1940), Best Acting for Raimu
 New York Film Critics Circle Awards (1940), Best Foreign Film

Restoration 
The film was restored by the company Hiventy, in full 4K, from the negative 35mm nitrate original, supervised by the filmmaker's grandson Nicolas Pagnol and Guillaume Schiffman. There is a Region B blu-ray edition available.

References

External links 
 
 
 
 The Baker’s Wife: Bread, Love, and a Trophy Wife an essay by Ginette Vincendeau at the Criterion Collection

1938 films
French black-and-white films
1938 comedy-drama films
Films based on French novels
Films based on works by Jean Giono
Films directed by Marcel Pagnol
1930s French-language films
French comedy-drama films
1930s French films